The 1980 Australian Hard Court Tennis Championships was a men's tennis tournament that was part of the 1980 Grand Prix tennis circuit. It was the 36th edition of the event and was held in Hobart, Australia from 31 December 1979 until 6 January 1980 and played on outdoor hardcourts. Unseeded  Shlomo Glickstein won the singles title.

Finals

Singles
 Shlomo Glickstein defeated  Robert Van't Hof 7–6, 6–4
 It was Glickstein's first singles title of his career.

Doubles
 John James /  Chris Kachel defeated  Phil Davies /  Brad Guan 6–4, 6–4

References

External links
 ITF tournament edition details

Australian Hard Court Championships
Sports competitions in Tasmania
Sport in Hobart